Andy Roddick won the men's singles tennis title at the 2004 Miami Open after Guillermo Coria retired in the final, with the scoreline at 6–7(2–7), 6–3, 6–1.

Andre Agassi was the three-time defending champion, but lost in the fourth round to Agustín Calleri. Agassi's win over Max Mirnyi in the third round was his record 20th consecutive win at the Miami Open.

The third round match between Rafael Nadal and Roger Federer marks the first time they faced each other, eventually meeting on 39 more occasions.

Seeds
All thirty-two seeds received a bye to the second round.

  Roger Federer (third round)
  Andy Roddick (champion)
  Guillermo Coria (final, retired because of a back injury)
  Andre Agassi (fourth round)
  Carlos Moyá (quarterfinals)
  Rainer Schüttler (second round)
  Tim Henman (second round)
  David Nalbandian (withdrew)
  Paradorn Srichaphan (fourth round)
  Nicolás Massú (second round)
  Mark Philippoussis (second round)
  Sébastien Grosjean (fourth round)
  Sjeng Schalken (second round, defaulted for verbal abuse)
  Jiří Novák (third round)
  Martin Verkerk (second round)
  Mardy Fish (second round)
  Lleyton Hewitt (third round)
  Gustavo Kuerten (second round)
  Tommy Robredo (fourth round)
  Agustín Calleri (quarterfinals)
  Fernando González (semifinals)
  Albert Costa (second round)
  Feliciano López (second round)
  Arnaud Clément (second round)
  Juan Ignacio Chela (third round)
  Jonas Björkman (third round)
  Dominik Hrbatý (third round)
  Max Mirnyi (third round)
  Jarkko Nieminen (second round)
  Gastón Gaudio (second round)
  Marat Safin (second round)
  Rafael Nadal (fourth round)

Draw

Finals

Top half

Section 1

Section 2

Section 3

Section 4

Bottom half

Section 5

Section 6

Section 7

Section 8

References

External links
 Main draw

2004 NASDAQ-100 Open
NASDAQ-100 Open - Men's Singles